Wicklewood is a village and civil parish in the South Norfolk district of Norfolk, England.

The villages name probably means, 'wych-elm wood/clearing'. 'Wood' is redundant.

Governance
An electoral ward in the same name exists. This ward has a population of 3,308 at the 2011 Census.

Amenities 
The village has a small  primary school, Wicklewood School, as well as a small church, St Andrews and All Saints.

Wicklewood has a local cricket team that participates in various Sunday League matches and was the holder of the Wicklewood Shield trophy won in 2006.

The village also has one public house called the Cherry Tree where the full range of Buffy's ales, made in Tivetshall St. Mary, can be tasted.

Hospital Road is the site of a large neo-Georgian building, now private homes. This is the former Forehoe workhouse, built in the late 19th century. In 1948 it was incorporated into the National Health Service as Hill House Hospital, later Wicklewood Geriatric Hospital, before closing in 1974.

The former Ashcroft supported housing centre on Milestone Lane has been closed since 2015: as of 2019, the buildings are for sale to be redeveloped as private housing.

References

External links 

 Wicklewood Archive
 The Cherry Tree
 Buffy's Brewery
 Wicklewood home page
 Wicklewood Parish Council
 Wicklewood School

Villages in Norfolk
Civil parishes in Norfolk